Alejandro Octavio Deustua Escarza (22 March 1849 – 6 August 1945) was a Peruvian philosopher, educator and statesman. He was the Prime Minister of Peru from 9 August 1902 until 4 November 1902.

Biography
Deustua was born in Huancayo, Peru. His parents were Remigio Deustua and Toribia Escarza. Deustua studied in Guadalupe National School and graduated from Universidad de San Marcos in Lima, Peru. He died on 6 August 1945 at the age of 96 in Lima, Peru.

Peruvian ministry in 1902
Prime Minister and Minister for Home Affairs: Señor Alejandro Deustua
Minister of War and Marine: Colonel Diez Canseco
Minister of Justice: Dr. Jose Arias
Minister of Finance: Señor Jose Reinoso
Minister of Public Works: Señor Teodoro Elmor

Works 
 Copias de historia del arte. -- [Lima : s.n., 1900]
 Apuntes sobre enseñanza secundaria. -- Lima : Impr. Americana, 1908
 La Cultura superior en Italia. -- Lima : Librería francesa científica, 1912
 A propósito de un cuestionario sobre la reforma de la ley de instrucción. -- [Lima] : Impr. M. A. Dávila, 1914
 La reforma de la segunda enseñanza. -- Lima : Impr. del "Centro Editorial", 1916
 Las ideas de orden y de libertad en la historia del pensamiento humano. -- Lima : Casa Ed. E.R. Villarán, 1919
 Apuntes para el curso de estética. -- Lima : Emp. Tip. Unión, [1920?]
 Estética general. -- Lima : Imp. Eduardo Rávago, [1923]
 Lo bello en la naturaleza. -- Lima : Impr. A.J. Rivas Berrio, 1929
 La cultura superior en Suiza. -- Lima : Impr. A.J. Rivas Berrio, 1929
 Estética aplicada. Lo bello en la naturaleza (apuntes) . -- Lima : Impr. A.J. Rivas Berrio, 1929
 Informe presentado al Supremo gobierno del Perú. -- Lima : Impr. A.J. Berrio, 1929–1930
 Ante el conflicto nacional. -- [Callao] : Emp. Edit. de El Callao, [1931?]
 Estética aplicada. -- Lima : , 1932
 Lo bello en el arte. -- Lima : , 1932
 Estética aplicada : lo bello en el arte: escultura, pintura, música, apuntes y extractos. -- Lima : Impr. Americana, [1935?]
 Cultura política. -- Lima : Emp. Ed. El Callao, [1936?]
 La cultura nacional. -- Lima : [Empresa Ed. de El Callao], 1937
 Los sistemas de moral. -- [Callao] : Ed. El Callao, 1938–1940
 La estética de José Vasconcelos. -- Lima : Tall. Gráf. de P. Barrantes C., 1939
 Ensayos escogidos de filosofía y educación nacional. -- [, 1967] (obra postuma).
 El problema nacional de la educación. -- [Lima : Emp. Editora de El Callao, 1970?] (obra póstuma).

References 

 Anuario Bibliografico Peruano de 1945. -- Lima, 1946.

Peruvian philosophers
1849 births
1945 deaths
People from Huancayo
Peruvian humanists
Peruvian educators